The Aegean Sea is an elongated embayment of the Mediterranean Sea between Europe and Asia. It is located between the Balkans and Anatolia, and covers an area of some 215,000 square kilometres. In the north, the Aegean is connected to the Marmara Sea, which in turn connects to the Black Sea, by the straits of the Dardanelles and the Bosphorus, respectively. The Aegean Islands are located within the sea and some bound it on its southern periphery, including Crete and Rhodes. The sea reaches a maximum depth of 2,639m to the west of Karpathos. The Thracian Sea and the Sea of Crete are main subdivisions of the Aegean Sea.

The Aegean Islands can be divided into several island groups, including the Dodecanese, the Cyclades, the Sporades, the Saronic islands and the North Aegean Islands, as well as Crete and its surrounding islands. The Dodecanese, located to the southeast, includes the islands of Rhodes, Kos, and Patmos; the islands of Delos and Naxos are within the Cyclades to the south of the sea. Lesbos is part of the North Aegean Islands. Euboea, the second-largest island in Greece, is located in the Aegean, despite being administered as part of Central Greece. Nine out of twelve of the Administrative regions of Greece border the sea, along with the Turkish provinces of Edirne, Canakkale, Balıkesir, Izmir, Aydın and Muğla to the east of the sea. Various Turkish islands in the sea are Imbros, Tenedos, Cunda Island, and the Foça Islands.

The Aegean Sea has been historically important, especially in regards to the civilization of Ancient Greece, who inhabited the area around the coast of the Aegean and the Aegean islands. The Aegean islands facilitated contact between the people of the area and between Europe and Asia. Along with the Greeks, Thracians lived among the northern coast. The Romans conquered the area under the Roman Empire, and later the Byzantine Empire held it against advances by the First Bulgarian Empire. The Fourth Crusade weakened Byzantine control of the area, and it was eventually conquered by the Ottoman Empire, with the exception of Crete, which was a Venetian colony until 1669. The Greek War of Independence allowed a Greek state on the coast of the Aegean from 1829 onwards. The Ottoman Empire held a presence over the sea for over 500 years, until it was replaced by modern Turkey.

The rocks making up the floor of the Aegean are mainly limestone, though often greatly altered by volcanic activity that has convulsed the region in relatively recent geologic times. Of particular interest are the richly coloured sediments in the region of the islands of Santorini and Milos, in the south Aegean. Notable cities on the Aegean coastline include Athens, Thessaloniki, Volos, Kavala and Heraklion in Greece, and İzmir and Bodrum in Turkey. The Aegean Sea groundwater itself has a high salinity content leading one to think that the soil would be infertile due to the volcanic region, but actually has an equilibrium with its soil content structure making it able to grow fertile crops on land that would seem infertile. 

A number of issues concerning sovereignty within the Aegean Sea are disputed between Greece and Turkey. The Aegean dispute has had a large effect on Greek-Turkish relations since the 1970s. Issues include the delimitation of territorial waters, national airspace, exclusive economic zones and flight information regions.

Name and etymology
Late Latin authors referred the name Aegaeus to Aegeus, who was said to have jumped into that sea to drown himself (rather than throwing himself from the Athenian acropolis, as told by some Greek authors). He was the father of Theseus, the mythical king and founder-hero of Athens. Aegeus had told Theseus to put up white sails when returning if he was successful in killing the Minotaur. When Theseus returned, he forgot these instructions, and Aegeus thinking his son to have died then drowned himself in the sea.

The sea was known in Latin as Mare Aegaeum under the control of the Roman Empire. The Venetians, who ruled many Greek islands in the High and Late Middle Ages, popularized the name Archipelago (meaning "main sea" or "chief sea"), a name that held on in many European countries until the early modern period. In the South Slavic languages, the Aegean is called White Sea. The Turkish name for the sea is Ege Denizi, derived from the Greek name.

Geography
The Aegean Islands are found within its waters, with the following islands delimiting the sea on the south, generally from west to east: Kythera, Antikythera, Crete, Kasos, Karpathos and Rhodes. The Anatolian peninsula marks the eastern boundary of the sea, while the Greek mainland marks the west. Several seas are contained within the Aegean Sea; the Thracian Sea is a section of the Aegean located to the north, the Icarian Sea to the east, the Myrtoan Sea to the west, while the Sea of Crete is the southern section.

The Greek regions that border the sea, in alphabetical order, are Attica, Central Greece, Central Macedonia, Crete, Eastern Macedonia and Thrace, North Aegean, Peloponnese, South Aegean, and Thessaly. The historical region of Macedonia also borders the sea, to the north.

The Aegean Islands, which almost all belong to Greece, can be divided into seven groups:
 Northeastern Aegean Islands, which lie in the Thracian Sea 
 East Aegean Islands (Euboea) 
 Northern Sporades
 Cyclades
 Saronic Islands (or Argo-Saronic Islands)
 Dodecanese (or Southern Sporades)
 Crete

Many of the Aegean islands or island chains, are geographically extensions of the mountains on the mainland. One chain extends across the sea to Chios, another extends across Euboea to Samos, and a third extends across the Peloponnese and Crete to Rhodes, dividing the Aegean from the Mediterranean.

The bays and gulfs of the Aegean beginning at the South and moving clockwise include on Crete, the Mirabello, Almyros, Souda and Chania bays or gulfs, on the mainland the Myrtoan Sea to the west with the Argolic Gulf, the Saronic Gulf northwestward, the Petalies Gulf which connects with the South Euboic Sea, the Pagasetic Gulf which connects with the North Euboic Sea, the Thermian Gulf northwestward, the Chalkidiki Peninsula including the Cassandra and the Singitic Gulfs, northward the Strymonian Gulf and the Gulf of Kavala and the rest are in Turkey; Saros Gulf, Edremit Gulf, Dikili Gulf, Gulf of Çandarlı, Gulf of İzmir, Gulf of Kuşadası, Gulf of Gökova, Güllük Gulf.

The Aegean sea is connected to the Sea of Marmara by the Dardanelles, also known from Classical Antiquity as the Hellespont. The Dardanelles are located to the northeast of the sea. It ultimately connects with the Black Sea through the Bosphoros strait, upon which lies the city of Istanbul. The Dardanelles and the Bosphoros are known as the Turkish Straits.

Extent
According to the International Hydrographic Organization, the limits of the Aegean Sea as follows:

 On the south: A line running from Cape Aspro (28°16′E) in Asia Minor, to Cum Burnù (Capo della Sabbia) the Northeast extreme of the Island of Rhodes, through the island to Cape Prasonisi, the Southwest point thereof, on to Vrontos Point (35°33′N) in Skarpanto [Karpathos], through this island to Castello Point, the South extreme thereof, across to Cape Plaka (East extremity of Crete), through Crete to Agria Grabusa, the Northwest extreme thereof, thence to Cape Apolitares in Antikithera Island, through the island to Psira Rock (off the Northwest point) and across to Cape Trakhili in Kithera Island, through Kithera to the Northwest point (Cape Karavugia) and thence to Cape Santa Maria in the Morea.
 In the Dardanelles: A line joining Kum Kale (26°11′E) and Cape Helles.

Hydrography
Aegean surface water circulates in a counterclockwise gyre, with hypersaline Mediterranean water moving northward along the west coast of Turkey, before being displaced by less dense Black Sea outflow. The Black Sea outflow moves westward along the northern Aegean Sea, then flows southwards along the east coast of Greece.

The physical oceanography of the Aegean Sea is controlled mainly by the regional climate, the fresh water discharge from major rivers draining southeastern Europe, and the seasonal variations in the Black Sea surface water outflow through the Dardanelles Strait.

Analysis of the Aegean during 1991 and 1992 revealed three distinct water masses:

 Aegean Sea Bottom Water – occurring at depths below 500–1000 m with a very uniform temperature (13–14 °C) and salinity (3.91–3.92%).

Climate 

The climate of the Aegean Sea largely reflects the climate of Greece and Western Turkey, which is to say, predominately Mediterranean. According to the Köppen climate classification, most of the Aegean is classified as Hot-summer Mediterranean (Csa), with hotter and drier summers along with milder and wetter winters. However, high temperatures during summers are generally not quite as high as those in arid or semiarid climates due to the presence of a large body of water. This is most predominant in the west and east coasts of the Aegean, and within the Aegean islands. In the north of the Aegean Sea, the climate is instead classified as Cold semi-arid (BSk), which feature cooler summers than Hot-summer Mediterranean climates.
The Etesian winds are a dominant weather influence in the Aegean Basin.

The below table lists climate conditions of some major Aegean cities:

Population 
Numerous Greek and Turkish settlements are located along their mainland coast, as well as on towns on the Aegean islands. The largest cities are Athens and Thessaloniki in Greece and İzmir in Turkey. The most populated of the Aegean islands is Crete, followed by Euboea and Rhodes.

Biogeography and ecology

Protected Areas 
Greece has established several marine protected areas along its coasts. According to the Network of Managers of Marine Protected Areas in the Mediterranean (MedPAN), four Greek MPAs are participating in the Network. These include Alonnisos Marine Park, while the Missolonghi–Aitoliko Lagoons and the island of Zakynthos are not on the Aegean.

History

Ancient history 

The current coastline dates back to about 4000 BC. Before that time, at the peak of the last ice age (about 18,000 years ago) sea levels everywhere were 130 metres lower, and there were large well-watered coastal plains instead of much of the northern Aegean. When they were first occupied, the present-day islands including Milos with its important obsidian production were probably still connected to the mainland. The present coastal arrangement appeared around 9,000 years ago, with post-ice age sea levels continuing to rise for another 3,000 years after that.

The subsequent Bronze Age civilizations of Greece and the Aegean Sea have given rise to the general term Aegean civilization. In ancient times, the sea was the birthplace of two ancient civilizations – the Minoans of Crete and the Myceneans of the Peloponnese.

The Minoan civilization was a Bronze Age civilization on the island of Crete and other Aegean islands, flourishing from around 3000 to 1450 BC before a period of decline, finally ending at around 1100 BC. It represented the first advanced civilization in Europe, leaving behind massive building complexes, tools, stunning artwork, writing systems, and a massive network of trade. The Minoan period saw extensive trade between Crete, Aegean, and Mediterranean settlements, particularly the Near East. The most notable Minoan palace is that of Knossos, followed by that of Phaistos. The Mycenaean Greeks arose on the mainland, becoming the first advanced civilization in mainland Greece, which lasted from approximately 1600 to 1100 BC. It is believed that the site of Mycenae, which sits close to the Aegean coast, was the center of Mycenaean civilization. The Mycenaeans introduced several innovations in the fields of engineering, architecture and military infrastructure, while trade over vast areas of the Mediterranean, including the Aegean, was essential for the Mycenaean economy. Their syllabic script, the Linear B, offers the first written records of the Greek language and their religion already included several deities that can also be found in the Olympic Pantheon. Mycenaean Greece was dominated by a warrior elite society and consisted of a network of palace-centered states that developed rigid hierarchical, political, social and economic systems. At the head of this society was the king, known as wanax.

The civilization of Mycenaean Greeks perished with the collapse of Bronze Age culture in the eastern Mediterranean, to be followed by the so-called Greek Dark Ages. It is undetermined what cause the collapse of the Mycenaeans. During the Greek Dark Ages, writing in the Linear B script ceased, vital trade links were lost, and towns and villages were abandoned.

Ancient Greece 

The Archaic period followed the Greek Dark Ages in the 8th century BC. Greece became divided into small self-governing communities, and adopted the Phoenician alphabet, modifying it to create the Greek alphabet. By the 6th century BC several cities had emerged as dominant in Greek affairs: Athens, Sparta, Corinth, and Thebes, of which Athens, Sparta, and Corinth were closest to the Aegean Sea. Each of them had brought the surrounding rural areas and smaller towns under their control, and Athens and Corinth had become major maritime and mercantile powers as well. In the 8th and 7th centuries BC many Greeks emigrated to form colonies in Magna Graecia (Southern Italy and Sicily), Asia Minor and further afield. The Aegean Sea was the setting for one of the most pivotal naval engagements in history, when on September 20, 480 B.C. the Athenian fleet gained a decisive victory over the Persian fleet of the Xerxes II of Persia at the Battle of Salamis. Thus ending any further attempt of western expansion by the Achaemenid Empire.

The Aegean Sea would later come to be under the control, albeit briefly, of the Kingdom of Macedonia. Philip II and his son Alexander the Great led a series of conquests that led not only to the unification of the Greek mainland and the control of the Aegean Sea under his rule, but also the destruction of the Achaemenid Empire. After Alexander the Great's death, his empire was divided among his generals. Cassander became king of the Hellenistic kingdom of Macedon, which held territory along the western coast of the Aegean, roughly corresponding to modern-day Greece. The Kingdom of Lysimachus had control over the sea's eastern coast. Greece had entered the Hellenistic period.

Roman rule 
The Macedonian Wars were a series of conflicts fought by the Roman Republic and its Greek allies in the eastern Mediterranean against several different major Greek kingdoms. They resulted in Roman control or influence over the eastern Mediterranean basin, including the Aegean, in addition to their hegemony in the western Mediterranean after the Punic Wars. During Roman rule, the land around the Aegean Sea fell under the provinces of Achaea, Macedonia, Thracia, Asia and Creta et Cyrenica (island of Crete)

Medieval period 

The Fall of the Western Roman Empire allowed its successor state, the Byzantine Empire, to continue Roman control over the Aegean Sea. However, their territory would later be threatened by the Early Muslim conquests initiated by Muhammad in the 7th century. Although the Rashidun Caliphate did not manage to obtain land along the coast of the Aegean sea, its conquest of the Eastern Anatolian peninsula as well as Egypt, the Levant, and North Africa left the Byzantine Empire weakened. The Umayyad Caliphate expanded the territorial gains of the Rashidun Caliphate, conquering much of North Africa, and threatened the Byzantine Empire's control of Western Anatolia, where it meets the Aegean Sea.

During the 820s, Crete was conquered by a group of Berbers Andalusians exiles led by Abu Hafs Umar al-Iqritishi, and it became an independent Islamic state. The Byzantine Empire launched a campaign that took most of the island back in 842 and 843 under Theoktistos, but the reconquest was not completed and was soon reversed. Later attempts by the Byzantine Empire to recover the island were without success. For the approximately 135 years of its existence, the emirate of Crete was one of the major foes of Byzantium. Crete commanded the sea lanes of the Eastern Mediterranean and functioned as a forward base and haven for Muslim corsair fleets that ravaged the Byzantine-controlled shores of the Aegean Sea. Crete returned to Byzantine rule under Nikephoros Phokas, who launched a huge campaign against the Emirate of Crete in 960 to 961.

Meanwhile, the Bulgarian Empire threatened Byzantine control of Northern Greece and the Aegean coast to the south. Under Presian I and his successor Boris I, the Bulgarian Empire managed to obtain a small portion of the northern Aegean coast. Simeon I of Bulgaria led Bulgaria to its greatest territorial expansion, and managed to conqueror much of the northern and western coasts of the Aegean. The Byzantines later regained control. The Second Bulgarian Empire achieved similar success along, again, the northern and western coasts, under Ivan Asen II of Bulgaria.

The Seljuq Turks, under the Seljuk Empire, invaded the Byzantine Empire in 1068, from which they annexed almost all the territories of Anatolia, including the east coast of the Aegean Sea, during the reign of Alp Arslan, the second Sultan of the Seljuk Empire. After the death of his successor, Malik Shah I, the empire was divided, and Malik Shah was succeeded in Anatolia by Kilij Arslan I, who founded the Sultanate of Rum. The Byzantines yet again recaptured the eastern coast of the Aegean.

After Constantinople was occupied by Western European and Venetian forces during the Fourth Crusade, the area around the Aegean sea was fragmented into multiple entities, including the Latin Empire, the Kingdom of Thessalonica, the Empire of Nicaea, the Principality of Achaea, and the Duchy of Athens. The Venetians created the maritime state of the Duchy of the Archipelago, which included all the Cyclades except Mykonos and Tinos. The Empire of Nicaea, a Byzantine rump state, managed to effect the Recapture of Constantinople from the Latins in 1261 and defeat Epirus. Byzantine successes were not to last; the Ottomans would conquer the area around the Aegean coast, but before their expansion the Byzantine Empire had already been weakened from internal conflict. By the late 14th century the Byzantine Empire had lost all control of the coast of the Aegean Sea and could exercise power around their capital, Constantinople. The Ottoman Empire then gained control of all the Aegean coast with the exception of Crete, which was a Venetian colony until 1669.

Modern Period 

The Greek War of Independence allowed a Greek state on the coast of the Aegean from 1829 onward. The Ottoman Empire held a presence over the sea for over 500 years until its dissolution following World War I, when it was replaced by modern Turkey. During the war, Greece gained control over the area around the northern coast of the Aegean. By the 1930s, Greece and Turkey had about resumed their present-day borders.

In the Italo-Turkish War of 1912, Italy captured the Dodecanese islands, and had occupied them since, reneging on the 1919 Venizelos–Tittoni agreement to cede them to Greece. The Greco-Italian War took place from October 1940 to April 1941 as part of the Balkans Campaign of World War II. The Italian war aim was to establish a Greek puppet state, which would permit the Italian annexation of the Sporades and the Cyclades islands in the Aegean Sea, to be administered as a part of the Italian Aegean Islands. The German invasion resulted in the Axis occupation of Greece. The German troops evacuated Athens on 12 October 1944, and by the end of the month, they had withdrawn from mainland Greece. Greece was then liberated by Allied troops.

Economy and politics
Many of the islands in the Aegean have safe harbours and bays. In ancient times, navigation through the sea was easier than travelling across the rough terrain of the Greek mainland, and to some extent, the coastal areas of Anatolia. Many of the islands are volcanic, and marble and iron are mined on other islands. The larger islands have some fertile valleys and plains.

The Armenian king dynasty Achaemenids made one of the greatest highways of the Ancient world. Its name was "Royal road," its length was 2400km, and it was situated between  Persian Empire and the Aegean sea. A part of the road passed by the southwest of Armenia, which gave an excellent opportunity to participate in international trading. 

Of the main islands in the Aegean Sea, two belong to Turkey – Bozcaada (Tenedos) and Gökçeada (Imbros); the rest belong to Greece. Between the two countries, there are political disputes over several aspects of political control over the Aegean space, including the size of territorial waters, air control and the delimitation of economic rights to the continental shelf. These issues are known as the Aegean dispute.

Transport 
Multiple ports are located along the Greek and Turkish coasts of the Aegean Sea. The port of Piraeus in Athens is the chief port in Greece, the largest passenger port in Europe and the third largest in the world, servicing about 20 million passengers annually. With a throughput of 1.4 million TEUs, Piraeus is placed among the top ten ports in container traffic in Europe and the top container port in the Eastern Mediterranean. Piraeus is also the commercial hub of Greek shipping. Piraeus bi-annually acts as the focus for a major shipping convention, known as Posidonia, which attracts maritime industry professionals from all over the world. Piraeus is currently Greece's third-busiest port in terms of tons of goods transported, behind Aghioi Theodoroi and Thessaloniki. The central port serves ferry routes to almost every island in the eastern portion of Greece, the island of Crete, the Cyclades, the Dodecanese, and much of the northern and the eastern Aegean Sea, while the western part of the port is used for cargo services.

As of 2007, the Port of Thessaloniki was the second-largest container port in Greece after the port of Piraeus, making it one of the busiest ports in Greece. In 2007, the Port of Thessaloniki handled 14,373,245 tonnes of cargo and 222,824 TEU's. Paloukia, on the island of Salamis, is a major passenger port.

Fishing 
Fish are Greece's second-largest agricultural export, and Greece has Europe's largest fishing fleet. Fish captured include sardines, mackerel, grouper, grey mullets, sea bass, and seabream. There is a considerable difference between fish catches between the pelagic and demersal zones; with respect to pelagic fisheries, the catches from the northern, central and southern Aegean area groupings are dominated, respectively, by anchovy, horse mackerels, and boops. For demersal fisheries, the catches from the northern and southern Aegean area groupings are dominated by grey mullets and pickerel (Spicara smaris) respectively.

The industry has been impacted by the Great Recession. Overfishing and habitat destruction is also a concern, threatening grouper, and seabream populations, resulting in perhaps a 50% decline of fish catch. To address these concerns, Greek fishermen have been offered a compensation by the government. Although some species are defined as protected or threatened under EU legislation, several illegal species such as the molluscs Pinna nobilis, Charonia tritonis and Lithophaga lithophaga, can be bought in restaurants and fish markets around Greece.

Tourism 

The Aegean islands within the Aegean Sea are significant tourist destinations. Tourism to the Aegean islands contributes a significant portion of tourism in Greece, especially since the second half of the 20th century. A total of five UNESCO World Heritage sites are located the Aegean Islands; these include the Monastery of Saint John the Theologian and the Cave of the Apocalypse on Patmos, the Pythagoreion and Heraion of Samos in Samos, the Nea Moni of Chios, the island of Delos, and the Medieval City of Rhodes.

Greece is one of the most visited countries in Europe and the world with over 33 million visitors in 2018, and the tourism industry around a quarter of Greece's Gross Domestic Product. The islands of Santorini, Crete, Lesbos, Delos, and Mykonos are common tourist destinations. An estimated 2 million tourists visit Santorini annually. However, concerns relating to overtourism have arisen in recent years, such as issues of inadequate infrastructure and overcrowding. Alongside Greece, Turkey has also been successful in developing resort areas and attracting large number of tourists, contributing to tourism in Turkey. The phrase "Blue Cruise" refers to recreational voyages along the Turkish Riviera, including across the Aegean. The ancient city of Troy, a World Heritage Site, is on the Turkish coast of the Aegean.

Greece and Turkey both take part in the Blue Flag beach certification programme of the Foundation for Environmental Education. The certification is awarded for beaches and marinas meeting strict quality standards including environmental protection, water quality, safety and services criteria. As of 2015, the Blue Flag has been awarded to 395 beaches and 9 marinas in Greece. Southern Aegean beaches on the Turkish coast include Muğla, with 102 beaches awarded with the blue flag, along with İzmir and Aydın, who have 49 and 30 beaches awarded respectively.

See also

 Exclusive economic zone of Greece
 Geography of Turkey
 List of Greek place names

References

External links

 

 
Seas of Greece
Seas of Turkey
Marginal seas of the Mediterranean
European seas
Seas of Asia
Geography of Southern Europe
Geography of Western Asia
Landforms of Çanakkale Province
Landforms of Muğla Province
Landforms of İzmir Province
Landforms of Balıkesir Province
Landforms of Edirne Province
Landforms of Aydın Province